Minuscule 70 (in the Gregory-Aland numbering), ε 521 (von Soden), is a Greek minuscule manuscript of the New Testament, on parchment leaves. Palaeographically it has been assigned to the 15th century. The manuscript has complex contents. Marginalia are incomplete.

Description 

The codex contains complete text of the four Gospels on 186 leaves (size ). The text is written in one column per page, 23 lines per page. The large initial letters in gold and colour.

Text 

The Greek text of the codex is a representative of the Byzantine text-type. Aland placed it in Category V.

According to the Claremont Profile Method it represents the textual family Kx in Luke 1 and Luke 20. In Luke 10 no profile was made. It belongs to the textual cluster 17.

In Matthew 1:11 it has additional reading τον Ιωακιμ, Ιωακιμ δε εγεννησεν (of Joakim, and Joakim was the father of). The reading is supported by Codex Campianus, Koridethi, manuscripts of the textual family f1, Minuscule 17, 33, 71, and 120; the reading was cited by Griesbach in his Novum Testamentum Graece.

History 

The manuscript was written in Paris between 1491-1494 for Guillaume Budé by George Hermonymus (like codices 30 and 287). It once belonged to Bunckle of London, then to Bishop Moore. It was used by John Mill in his Novum Testamentum (as Bu.). C. R. Gregory saw it in 1885.

It is currently housed in at the Cambridge University Library (Ll. 2.13), at Cambridge.

See also 

 List of New Testament minuscules
 Biblical manuscript
 Textual criticism

References

Further reading 
 

Greek New Testament minuscules
15th-century biblical manuscripts
Manuscripts in Cambridge